The Battle of Žepče was a battle between Army B&H and Croatian Defence Council in Žepče, Bosnia and Herzegovina on the 24th of June 1993. The 319th Mountain Brigade which was located in the city found itself surrounded while other brigade of Army B&H took over high ground around city. Žepče was defended by HVO 111th xp Žepče brigade and Andrija Tadić battalion. After six days of fighting for Žepče, on 30 June Galib Dervišević agrees to surrender of 305th and 319th Brigade after which brigades ceases to exist.

Captured Bosniak soldiers numbered to around 5000.

References

Battles of the Bosnian War
Military operations of the Bosnian War
1993 in Bosnia and Herzegovina
June 1993 events in Europe
Conflicts in 1993
Army of the Republic of Bosnia and Herzegovina
Croatian Defence Council